The National Union of Students of the Philippines is an alliance of student councils in the Philippines established in 1957. Advocating for democratic rights of students, it boasts about 600 member councils and is part of International Union of Students (IUS) and the Asia Pacific Youth and Students Association (ASA). It is also a member and a founding organization of Kabataan Partylist.

History

Early years 
The National Union of Students of the Philippines (NUSP) was established in 1957, seceding from Student Council's Association of the Philippines. The group seceded partly because leaders of the former group promised votes for politicians, which affected and silenced students' opinions. Artemio Panganiban became one of the co-founders of NUSP and served as its president from 1958 to 1959.

Marcos dictatorship 
The union has been very active as part of the student movement in the Philippines. Edgar Jopson was elected NUSP president during the 13th annual conference in 1969. After the conference, they led a major mobilization rally in front of the Congress, while then-president Ferdinand Marcos was delivering his State of the Nation Address (SONA). During the joint mobilization of moderates and radicals, about 5 p.m., students threw a coffin, a stuffed alligator, and stones at Ferdinand and Imelda Marcos as they left the Congress Building. They also burned an effigy of Marcos. Under Jopson's two-term tenure, the union participated in socio-political issues, especially as part of the First Quarter Storm and the Second Propaganda Movement.

They were concerned with Marcos's Constitutional Convention from 1971 to 1973. NUSP was a moderate group during this time, challenging Marcos not to have another term beyond the two-term limit that was set by the 1935 Philippine Constitution, as compared to Kabataang Makabayan, a more radical youth group that pursued systemic structural changes.

Post-EDSA 
NUSP was also part of the Second People Power Uprising.

During the early administration of President Gloria Macapagal Arroyo, a youth initiative called Youth Movement for Justice and Meaningful Change, composed of Anakbayan, League of Filipino Students, Student Christian Movement of the Philippines, College Editors' Guild of the Philippines, and NUSP met at the office of Anakbayan in Padre Noval, Sampaloc, Manila, to discuss plans to advance the interests of the Filipino youth. Talks were made due to the disillusionment brought by the new administration. Eventually, these talks culminated in the formation of Anak ng Bayan Youth Party (Kabataan Partylist) on June 19, 2001, coinciding with the birthday of José Rizal.

Amid the effects of the COVID-19 pandemic among students in the Philippines, the union has been advocating for safe resumption of face-to-face classes, for they said that online distance learning has been detrimental to the welfare of the students.

The current president of NUSP is Jandeil Roperos, who was also the third nominee of Kabataan Partylist for the 2022 national elections. Kabataan Partylist's first nominee was Raoul Manuel, a former president of the NUSP.

Notable alumni 

 Artemio Panganiban
 Edgar Jopson
 John Osmeña
 Raul Roco
 Rene Saguisag
 Sonia Malasarte
 Ricardo Puno Jr.
 Ronaldo Puno
 Salvador Britanico
 Violy Calvo
 Loida Nicolas
 Nely Nicolas
 Macapanton Abbas
 Carlos Padilla
 Miriam Defensor
 Tina Monzon
 Jose Lina
 Francis Pangilinan
 Lean Alejandro
 Chito Gascon
 Lorenzo Tañada III
 Hernani Braganza
 Mike Defensor
 Sarah Elago
 Raoul Manuel

References 

Activism in the Philippines
Student organizations in the Philippines
Youth organizations based in the Philippines
Students' unions in the Philippines